Sydney Parade Railway Station is located at Sydney Parade Avenue in Sandymount, Dublin 4, Ireland. The alternative spelling Sidney Parade is also in common usage.

It serves the southern end of Dublin 4, St Vincent's Hospital at Elm Park and the RTÉ Radio and Television studios at Montrose, Donnybrook.

There is a level crossing at the northern end of the station.

The ticket office is open between 06:00-00:00, Monday to Friday. It is unmanned on Saturday and Sunday.

History
The station opened in January 1835, as a halt on the Dublin and Kingstown Railway. In 1852, it was upgraded to a full station with the construction of shelters, stone platforms and a footbridge.

It was named after Sidney Herbert, 1st Baron Herbert of Lea.

The station was closed in 1960 and reopened in 1972. It was electrified in 1984 with the launch of DART services.

Transport services 
Directly outside the station are bus stops for the following routes:

 Dublin Bus route 47 from Poolbeg Street to Belarmine, via UCD
 UCD Shuttle, from the station to UCD Belfield Campus (term time only)

In addition, a number of bus services stop on Merrion Road, located 350 m from the station.

 Dublin Bus routes 4 from Harristown to Monkstown
 Dublin Bus routes 7 / 7A from Mountjoy Square to Bride's Glen / Loughlinstown.
 Dublin Bus 7N Nitelink from Dublin city centre to Shankill (Friday & Saturday only)
 Dublin Bus 84N Nitelink from Dublin city centre to Greystones (Friday & Saturday only)
 Aircoach route 703 from Killiney to Dublin Airport
 Aircoach route 702 from Greystones to Dublin Airport

Literary references
A crucial incident in the story "A Painful Case" by James Joyce (from his collection Dubliners) occurs here.

The station is mentioned in the title of the bestselling book Should Have Got Off at Sydney Parade authored under the pen-name Ross O'Carroll-Kelly.

See also
 List of railway stations in Ireland

References

External links

 Irish Rail Sydney Parade Station Website

 
Iarnród Éireann stations in Dublin (city)
1835 establishments in Ireland
Railway stations in the Republic of Ireland opened in 1835